= Haroorayso =

- District
- Location within Ethiopia
- Country: Ethiopia

Haroorayso is a district of Somali Region in Ethiopia.

== See also ==
- Districts of Ethiopia
